The 60th annual Venice International Film Festival was held from 27 August to 6 September 2003. The festival opened with Woody Allen's Out of Competition film Anything Else.

Juries
The following people comprised the 2003 jury for the feature films of the main competition and for the short films of the official selection:

Main Competition (Venezia 60)
 Mario Monicelli (Italy), Jury President
 Stefano Accorsi (Italy)
 Michael Ballhaus (Germany)
 Ann Hui (Hong Kong, China)
 Pierre Jolivet (France)
 Monty Montgomery (USA)
 Assumpta Serna (Spain)

Upstream (Controcorrente)
The following people were selected to confer the San Marco Prize for best film, the Special Director's Award, an Upstream Prize for Best Actor, and one for Best Actress:
 Laure Adler, President
 Vito Amoruso
 Samir Farid
 Rene Liu
 Ulrich Tukur

"Luigi De Laurentiis" Award for a First Feature
The following people were selected to confer the Lion of the Future.
 Lia van Leer, President
 Jannike Ahlund
 Pierre-Henri Deleau
 Stefan Kitanov
 Peter Scarlet

Official selection

In competition
The following films were nominated to compete for the Golden Lion of the 60th edition of the festival:

Highlighted title indicates the Golden Lion winner.

Out of competition
The following films were screened as Out of Competition:
 Anything Else by Woody Allen (United States)
 Coffee and Cigarettes by Jim Jarmusch (United States)
 Intolerable Cruelty by Joel Coen (United States)
 Le Divorce by James Ivory (United Kingdom)
 Matchstick Men by Ridley Scott (United States)
 Monsieur Ibrahim (Monsieur Ibrahim et le fleurs du Coran) by François Dupeyron (France)
 Once Upon a Time in Mexico by Robert Rodriguez (United States)
 The Dreamers by Bernardo Bertolucci (Italy, UK, France)
 The Human Stain by Robert Benton (United States)

Special Event
 The Blues: Feel Like Going Home by Martin Scorsese (United States)
 The Blues: Godfathers and Sons by Marc Levin (United States)
 The Blues: Red, White and Blues by Mike Figgis (United Kingdom)
 The Blues: The Road To Memphis by Richard Pearce (United States)

Short film competition
The following films, whose length does not exceed 30 minutes, were selected for the short film competition:

Highlighted title indicates the winner of the Silver Lion for Best Short Film.

Upstream
A section of the official selection for feature films that stand out for their "innovative intent, creative originality or alternative cinematographic languages" 

Highlighted title indicates the San Marco Prize winner.

New Territories
The following films were selected for the New Territories (Nuovi Territori) section:

Autonomous sections

Venice International Film Critics' Week
The following feature films were selected to be screened as In Competition for this section:
 Ana and the Others (Ana y los otros) by Celina Murga (Argentina)
 Three-Step Dance (Ballo a tre passi) by Salvatore Mereu (Italy)
 Matrubhoomi (en. Matrubhoomi: A Nation Without Women) by Manish Jha (India)
 Mr. Butterfly (Nabi) by Kim Hyeon-seong (South Korea)
 Twist by Jacob Daniel Tierney (Canada)
 Variété Française by Frédéric Videau (France)
 15 by Royston Tan (Singapore)

Awards

Official selection
The following Official Awards were conferred at the 60th edition:
 Golden Lion:The Return (Vozvrashcheniye) by Andrey Zvyagintsev
 Silver Lion for Best Director: Takeshi Kitano for Zatōichi
 Grand Special Jury Prize: The Kite by Randa Chahal
 Volpi Cup for Best Actor: Sean Penn for 21 Grams
 Volpi Cup for Best Actress: Katja Riemann for Rosenstrasse
 Marcello Mastroianni Award (for the best emerging actor or actress): Najat Benssallem for Raja

Special Awards
 Golden Lion Honorary Award: Dino De Laurentiis and Omar Sharif

Short Film awards
 Silver Lion for Best Short Film: Neft (The Oil) by Murad Ibragimbekov
 UIP Award for Best European Short Film: The Trumouse Show by Julio Robledo 
 Special mention: Hochbetrieb by Andreas Krein

Other collateral awards
The following collateral awards were conferred to films of the official selection:
 FIPRESCI Award:
 Venezia 60: Goodbye Dragon Inn (Bu san) by Tsai Ming-liang (Taiwan 2003)
Parallel Section: Matrubhoomi by Manish Jha (India 2003)

References

External links

Venice Film Festival 2003 Awards on IMDb
New Territories - 60th Venice Film Festival 2003

V
V
Ven
Venice Film Festival
Film
August 2003 events in Europe
September 2003 events in Europe